

Personnel

 (D)

 (D)

 (D)
 (D)

Transfers
IN: Greer Barnes from Los Angeles Sol (July 2009)

Preseason
FC Gold Pride played two scrimmages against the Los Angeles Sol, losing both. They posted a 6-1 win over the University of California women's soccer team and a 3-0 win over an "All-Star" team of local college players.

Regular season

April 5 vs Boston

April 11 at Sky Blue FC

April 19 at Los Angeles

April 26 vs Washington

May 3 vs Sky Blue FC

May 9 at Saint Louis

May 16 at Chicago

May 24 vs Los Angeles

May 31 at Washington

June 7 vs Chicago

June 17 at Boston

June 21 at Los Angeles

July 5 vs Saint Louis

July 12 at Chicago

July 19 vs Boston

July 23 vs Los Angeles

July 26 at Saint Louis

August 1 vs Washington

August 5 at Sky Blue FC

August 9 vs Saint Louis

References

FC Gold Pride
Gold Pride
Gold
FC Gold Pride
Women's football club seasons